Valdir Benedito (born 25 October 1965) is a retired Brazilian footballer who played as a midfielder for Atlético Paranaense (Brazil), Atlético Mineiro (Brazil), Cruzeiro (Brazil), Internacional (Brazil) and Kashiwa Reysol (Japan).

Club career
Born in Araraquara, Valdir began playing football with local side Associação Ferroviária de Esportes.

International career
Valdir was a participant at the 1991 Copa América in Chile, and was capped 3 times for the Brazilian national team in 1991.

Career statistics

Club

International

References

External links

 

1965 births
Living people
People from Araraquara
Brazilian footballers
Brazilian expatriate footballers
Brazil international footballers
Club Athletico Paranaense players
Clube Atlético Mineiro players
Sport Club Internacional players
Kashiwa Reysol players
Expatriate footballers in Japan
J1 League players
Avaí FC players
América Futebol Clube (MG) players
Associação Atlética Internacional (Limeira) players
São Raimundo Esporte Clube footballers
Association football midfielders
Footballers from São Paulo (state)